Hollis/Brookline High School (HBHS) is a public school located in Hollis, New Hampshire, serving the towns of Hollis and Brookline. It is administered by New Hampshire School Administration Unit (SAU) 41.

Academics
Hollis-Brookline High School offers accelerated and honors courses in all departments, and has an advanced placement (AP) program including English Literature and Composition, English Language and Composition, Calculus, US History, Statistics, Physics, Computer Science, Chemistry, Biology and the newly added Environmental Science and World History. HBHS was named a Blue Ribbon School in 2010  and has appeared on the Newsweek list of top high schools in America.

Performing arts
One notable tradition is Night of the Living Guitars, an annual showcase of student bands that raised money for the music department. After being discontinued for a few years, the tradition was revived in 2008 under the name "Guitar Night". Some notable shows include Guitar Night 2016  and 2017. Some videos of these performances exist online. Other similar musical performances have included "HB Idol", "Jazz Night", and "Southern Rock Night".

HBHS has also hosted the New Hampshire Band Directors Association (NHBDA) Jazz Clinic for the past ten years, besides one cancellation due to snow in 2015. Local middle and high schools taking part in the jazz clinic can come for either the morning or afternoon session, where students can work with one of the three visiting jazz band directors as a whole ensemble and go to the sectional clinics held by esteemed jazz musicians for their respective instruments.

Robotics 
Hollis Brookline High School is home to the FIRST Robotics Competition (FRC) team 1073 The Force Team.  Robotics has a strong history at HBHS with the team having been founded in 2002 and actively competing in FRC every year since.  Team 1073 has earned invitations to the New England District Championships every year since 2016 and the World Championships every year since 2017 (excepting years that the Championships were cancelled due to the COVID pandemic).  In 2017 Team 1073 was a member of the alliance of three teams that won the New England District Championship.  In 2019, Team 1073 was a member of the alliance of three teams that won the Curie sub-division at the Detroit World Championships and competed in the final Einstein division, finishing in 3rd place.  Team 1073 has also won many FRC awards, including winning a Safety Award at at least one event every year since 2014 and winning Safety Awards at every event they attended in 2019.  

Robotics throughout the Hollis Brookline school district (SAU-41) is supported by the Hollis Brookline Robotics Boosters, an organization founded in 2018.

Notable alumni
Guy Ferland, film and television director
Ludwig Ahgren, Youtube Live Streamer, YouTuber
Our Last Night, the band was formed while the core members attended the high school

References

External links
Official website
SAU 41
The Cavalier Chronicle online
The Cavazine
Statistics
News story about Coach
Crew Club
HBHS FIRST Robotics

Public high schools in New Hampshire
Educational institutions established in 1997
Schools in Hillsborough County, New Hampshire
Hollis, New Hampshire
1997 establishments in New Hampshire